Kheyr Qoli (also Romanized as Kheyr Qolī) is a village in Shaban Rural District, in the Central District of Nahavand County, Hamadan Province, Iran. At the 2006 census, its population was 34, in 9 families.

References 

Populated places in Nahavand County